Irene  (minor planet designation: 14 Irene) is a large main-belt asteroid, discovered by the English astronomer John Russell Hind on May 19, 1851. The orbital plane is tilted at an angle of 9.1° to the plane of the ecliptic.

14 Irene was named after Irēnē, a personification of peace in Greek mythology. She was one of the Horae, daughter of Zeus and Themis. The name was suggested by Sir John Herschel. Hind wrote,
"You will readily discover that this name [...] has some relation to this event (the Great Industrial Exhibition) which is now filling our metropolis [London] with the talent of all civilised nations, with those of Peace, the productions of Art and Science, in which all mankind must feel an interest."
The Great Exhibition of the Works of Industry of All Nations in the Crystal Palace of Hyde Park, London, ran from May 1 until October 18, 1851.

Hind suggested that the symbol for the asteroid should be "A dove carrying an olive-branch, with a star on its head", but an actual drawing of the symbol was never made before the use of graphical symbols to represent asteroids was dropped entirely.

Observations from 2007 indicate that the rotation pole of 14 Irene lies close to the plane of the ecliptic, indicating it has an obliquity close to 90°. The fairly flat Irenian lightcurves indicate somewhat spherical proportions. This is a stony S-type asteroid with a mean diameter of around 152 km.  It is spinning with a rotation period of 15 hours.

There have been seven reported stellar occultation events by Irene. The best is a three chord event observed in 2013.

See also 
 Former classification of planets

Notes

References 

 Gould, B.A., New planet, Astronomical Journal, Vol. 2, iss. 27, p. 22, June 1851

External links 
  (displays Elong from Sun and V mag for 2011)
 
 

Background asteroids
Irene
Irene
S-type asteroids (Tholen)
S-type asteroids (SMASS)
18510519